Mitslal Kifleyesus-Matschie (born in 1968) is a German political scientist, public lecturer, entrepreneur, and aid worker. She is the CEO of the Ethiopian and German social company Ecological Products of Ethiopia (ECOPIA).

Education and career 
Mitslal was born as Mitslal Kifleyesus in Ethiopia in 1968. She received her Ph.D. in International Relations degree in 2006 from the University of Erfurt, Germany. She received her master's degree in International Relations and Strategy from Université Libre de Bruxelles in 1995.

In 1993, she started her career by providing consulting services to Preparatory Commission for the Organisation for the Prohibition of Chemical Weapons, today called the Organization for the Prohibition of Chemical Weapons (OPCW) based in Den Haag, the Netherlands She founded EuroContact, a consulting company for the private sector on technology that could be utilized for military purposes.

From 1995 to 1997, She worked as a researcher at Harvard Sussex Program on Chemical and Biological Weapons Armament and Arms Limitation.

In 2006, She founded Ecological Products of Ethiopia (ECOPIA), a social for-profit company in Ethiopia. It creates value chains for organic foods, herbal medicines, and natural cosmetics distributed in Ethiopia, East Africa, and Western Europe. She founded Seratera, an incubation program for start-ups in Africa.

Publications 

 Conversion Survey 1996 and 1997, Bonn International Center for Conversion 
 Why African States should ratify the Chemical Weapons Convention (in French), Dfis Sud, July 1996
 The role of Verification in International Relations: Erfurt University Online publication. 2006
 The changing nature of security in the Horn of Africa and the effect of these new conditions on traditional regional and international security architecture. Peter Lang Europäischer Verlang der Wissenschaften. 2007
 Mobile phone application of web-based food processing in Africa: Real-Time Reversed Auction for Food industry (ECA, Addis Ababa) 2008
 Internationale Beziehungen/ Friedens- und Konfliktforschung, 2008

Personal life 
From 1997 until 2010, Mitslal was married to a German politician of the Social Democratic Party (SPD) Christoph Matschie. They have two children.

References 

1968 births
Living people